Satish Kumar Nigam (born 1 January 1961) is an Indian politician and former member of the Uttar Pradesh Legislative Assembly. He won the Kalyanpur assembly seat after defeating the Bharatiya Janata Party candidate Premlata Katiyar. He is a politician of Samajwadi Party. He was elected as the chairman of the seven members committee formed by Uttar Pradesh Legislative Assembly Speaker Mata Prasad Pandey to give judgement on a sting operation of a news channel related to 2013 Muzaffarnagar Riots.

He lost his seat in the 2017 Uttar Pradesh Assembly election to Nilima Katiyar of the Bharatiya Janata Party.

References

External links
Uttar Pradesh Result on Election Commission Website

Samajwadi Party politicians
Living people
People from Kanpur Nagar district
Uttar Pradesh MLAs 2012–2017
1961 births
Samajwadi Party politicians from Uttar Pradesh